Arabic influence on the Spanish language overwhelmingly dates from the Muslim rule in the Iberian Peninsula between 711 and 1492. The influence results mainly from the large number of Arabic loanwords and derivations in Spanish, plus a few other less obvious effects.

History

The Spanish language, also called Castilian, is a Romance language that evolved from the dialects of Roman Vulgar Latin spoken in the Iberian peninsula. The first documents written in a language with some features specific of modern Spanish are ascribed to a number of documents from different monasteries in the area of Burgos and La Rioja in what is now northern Spain. However, Toledo in central Spain, which became the capital of the early Kingdom of Castile during its southward expansion, is where Spanish began to appear in a written form recognizable today. The pre-existing Mozarabic dialect of this region (i.e. the Romance present during Muslim rule) is therefore likely to have also had an influence on modern Spanish.

The lexical influence of Arabic reached its greatest level during the Christian Reconquista, when the emerging Kingdom of Castile conquered large territories from Moorish rulers particularly in the 11th, 12th and 13th centuries. These territories, which included the former Taifa of Toledo, had large numbers of Arabic speakers, as well as many who spoke local Romance dialects (Mozarabic language) that were heavily influenced by Arabic, both influencing Castilian. It is possible that Arabic words and their derivatives had also been priorly brought into Castilian by Mozarab Christians who emigrated northwards from Al Andalus in times of sectarian violence, particularly during the times of Almohad and Almoravid rule in the 12th and 13th centuries. As such, Arabic can be considered to have had a formative influence on the Spanish language.

The degree to which the Arabic language percolated through the Iberian Peninsula varied enormously from one period and area to another and is the subject of academic debate. However, it is generally agreed that, in much of the peninsula, Arabic was used among the local elites, Muslims and Christians, and that the prevalent vernacular in many areas was Mozarabic, a continuum of Arabic-influenced local Romance dialects. Only the southern third of the peninsula became totally Arabized as both Mozarabic and Christianity were extinguished following the Almoravid and Almohad periods.

Much of the Arabic influence upon Spanish came through the various Arabized Romance dialects that were spoken in areas under Moorish rule, known today by scholars as Mozarabic. This resulted in Spanish often having both Arabic and Latin derived words with the same meaning. For example, aceituna and oliva (olive), alacrán and escorpión (scorpion), jaqueca and migraña (migraine), alcancía and hucha (piggy bank), ajonjolí and  sésamo (sesame) etc.

The influence of the Arabized Mozarabic and of Arabic itself is more noticeable in the Spanish dialects from regions with a longer history of Moorish domination than those where it was shorter-lived. For this reason, the dialects of the southern half of the country, known collectively as castellano meridional or Southern Castilian, seem collectively to show a higher degree of preference for Arabisms. Northern Spanish dialects tend to prefer Romance synonyms to terms of Arabic origin, such as the Romance calendario vs. Arabic almanaque, hucha vs. alcancía, espliego vs. alhucema, etc. Because Canarian and all Hispanic American dialects are mainly derived from Southern Castilian, Spanish words of Arabic origin are common in most varieties of Modern Spanish.

A number of words were also borrowed from Moroccan Arabic principally as a result of Spain's protectorate over Spanish Morocco in the 19th and 20th centuries, although these are of minor significance.

The Spanish spoken in the Canary Islands has also adopted a small number of words from Hassaniya Arabic, principally from Canarian sailors who fish in proximity to the Saharan coast as well as by those Canarians who returned from Western Sahara after the Green March of 1975.

Lexical influence
The influence of Arabic on the Spanish language is fundamentally lexical but its other influences are also briefly examined in this article. It is estimated that there are about one thousand Arabic roots, and approximately three thousand derived words, for a total of around four thousand words or 8% of the Spanish dictionary. See Influences on the Spanish language for more on how the number of Arabisms in Spanish has been estimated. The exact number of words of Arabic origin and their derivatives in Spanish is not known, and many words not included on this list are regionalisms: words that are used in certain parts of Spain and/or Hispanic America but are generally unknown elsewhere.

The high point of Arabic word use in Spanish was in late medieval times and has declined since then, but hundreds are still used in normal conversation. A larger majority of these words are nouns, with a number of verbs and adjectives derived directly from these nouns, e.g. alquilar (to rent) and alquilado (rented) from alquiler (rent), most of which are excluded from this list. There is also one preposition: hasta ("until"), and one adverb: he. There has been little influence on the basic grammatical structure of the language.

Many Arabic loanwords in Spanish start with a- or al-, where these sounds come from the Arabic article al- (giving just a- when the Arabic word begins with a solar letter). This initial a(l)- is an integral part of the word in Spanish, that is, it's not a morpheme.

List of words of Arabic origin
This is an open list of Spanish words acquired directly from Classical and Andalusi Arabic, listed in alphabetical order. This list includes the Spanish meaning of the word as well as the Arabic etymology. No fixed standard of Arabic transliteration is used.

Rationale for inclusion

Due to the large influence of Arabic on Spanish vocabulary, this list is relatively restrictive:
This list has been edited to include only words which are considered to appertain to the Spanish language and the Hispanic culture and society. Arabic words which may be understood by Spanish speakers, but remain foreign to the Hispanic civilisation such as Ayatolá, Yihad, or Chiita, are excluded from this list.
Only words which have passed directly from Arabic are included. Arabic words which entered the Spanish language through other, non-Iberian, Indo-European languages (such as Ayatolá, Beduino, Sofá, or sorbete) are not included. Included as exceptions to this rule are álcali and álgebra, words of Arabic origin which are thought to have entered Spanish through "Low Latin"—as suggested by their initial stress (the Arabic definite article al- is not normally borrowed as a stressed syllable).
Generally, only Spanish root words are listed, derivations (including nouns, verbs or adjectives) not being included. For example, aceite (from az-zeit, oil) is included but not aceitería, aceitero, aceitón or aceitoso. On the other hand, aceituna (olive) is included since it derives not from az-zeit but from az-zeituna in Arabic, even though the root of the Arabic word is the same.  Aceituno (olive tree), on the other hand, would not be included, since it shares the same root as aceituna. For this reason a significant number of verbs and adjectives are excluded from this list. An exception to this rule may be made when the derived word is much more commonly used than the root word, when the meaning of the derivative has no evident connection with the root word or when it is not clear that one is derived from the other (e.g. horro and ahorrar).
Words derived from Mozarabic are not included (Mozarabic being fundamentally a Romance language), unless the Mozarabic word is itself derived from classical or Andalusi Arabic.
Words acquired from Berber or Hebrew (or other Afro-Asiatic languages) are not included.

The etymology and meaning of most of these words can be verified on the site of the Real Academia de la Lengua Española, although a small minority are only available in other sources or past editions of this dictionary.

Many of these words will be unfamiliar to many Spanish speakers because their use is restricted to certain regions of Spain or Spanish-speaking countries or they are no longer in regular use. For example, the word for Arabic-derived word for "jewel" alhaja is very common in Mexico whereas in Spain it is restricted to rural areas of the southern half of the country, the alternative Spanish term joya being much more common. On the other hand the Arabic derived term for fruit juice zumo is the standard term in Spain whereas in Hispanic America the Latin-derived jugo or agua are generally used. The Arabic term alberca in Spain refers to agricultural water deposits, whereas in Mexico it is the common term used for swimming pool as opposed to piscina elsewhere or pileta in Argentina.

A (Ababol to Azumbre)
ababol: poppy, in Aragon, Navarre, Albacete and Murcia. From Andalusian Arabic Happapáwr, a fusion from the Arabic plural al-ḥabūb (الْحَبُوب), the generic term for "seeds, beans or grains", and the Latin papāver.
abacero: owner of an abacería, small food shop. From Andalusi Arabic *ṣaḥb uz-zād "owner of supplies."
abadí: descendant/lineage of Mohammed ben Abad, founder of the Taifa Kingdom of Seville in the 11th century AD. From Andalusi Arabic  'abbādī (عبّادي).
abalorio: cheap jewellery or jewellery beads. From Andalusi Arabic and Arabic al-ballūriy[u] (الْبَلُّورِيُِّ) "[made of/ like] glass or clear as crystal". Ultimately from Greek , "beryl"
abarraz: stavesacre (Delphinium staphisagria), a medicinal plant. From Andalusian Arabic ḥább arrás "head seeds."
abasí: pertaining to the Abbasid dynasty, which overthrew the Umayyads in the 8th century.
abelmosco: musk seeds, an aromatic plant. From Andalusi Arabic ḥabb al musk literally "musk seeds." Classical Arabic ḥabbu 'l musk.
abencerraje: used in expression: "Zegríes y abencerrajes", "partisans of opposite interests". The Abencerrajes (in Arabic aban as-sarráǧ) was an Arabic family of the Kingdom of Granada, rivals of the Zegríes in the 15th century.	
abenuz: ebony. From Arabic abanūs (أَبَنُوس) of the same meaning but in Arabic referring to the "black wood" of the tropical tree.
abismal: screw in head of a spear. From Arabic al-mismar (الْمِسْمَر) "nail."
abitaque: a cut of wood used in construction of a certain shape and dimension. From Arabic aṭ-ṭabaqah (الطَّبَقَة) "layer" or "intermediate chamber" or "group, standard, type".
acebibe: raisin. From Arabic az-zabīb (الزَّبِيب) of the same meaning but also "dried grape" or "currant" [= Ribes, genus of berry plants, e.g. blackcurrant, redcurrant and white currant].
acebuche: wild olive tree, or wood from such a tree. From Andalusi Arabic azzabbúǧ.
aceche: copper, iron or zinc sulphate. From Andalusi (Hispanic) Arabic *azzáj, < az-zāj, < . From Classical Arabic    az-zāj (الزَّاج), meaning vitriol - sulphuric acid or a sulphate.
aceifa: Muslim summer military expedition. From Arabic aṣ-ṣayf (الصَّيْف), "summer".
aceite: oil. From Arabic az-zayt (الزَّيْت) "oil".
aceituna: olive. From Arabic az-zaytūn (الزَّيْتُون) "olive".
aceituní: precious cloth from the Orient. From Arabic az-zaytuni, a possible adaptation of the Chinese city Tsö-Thung .
acelga: Chard. From Arabic as-salq (السَّلْق) of the same meaning.
acémila: beast of burden; tax formerly paid in Spain. From Arabic az-zamilah "beast of burden", most likely stemming the Arabic scientific term for "pack-animal", "aḍ-ḍābatu 'l-ḥaml (الذَّابَةُ الْحَمْل)"
acemite: wheat husk; a type of wheat porridge. From Arabic semolina, as-samid (السَّمِيد).
acenefa: see cenefa.
aceña: watermill. From Arabic as-saniyah (السانية‎) "the lifter."
acequia: irrigation canal. From Arabic as-saqiyah "the irrigator."
acerola: fruit of the trees Malpighia emarginata or M. glabra, generally found in the Americas, of the Malpighiaceae family. This should be differentiated from the European Service Rowan Tree (Sorbus domestica), family Rosaceae. From Arabic zu 'rūrah. Originally from Syriac za‘rārā.
acetre: bucket or cauldron used to extract water from a well; small cauldron used to spray holy water in Christian liturgy. From Arabic as-saṭl.
aciar: (or acial): instrument used to keep farm-animals still by squeezing their ear or snout. From Arabic az-ziyār (الزِيَار) with the same meaning.
acíbar: aloe (both the plant and its bitter juice); bitterness, grief, distaste. From Arabic aṣ-ṣabir (الصَّبِر).
acicalar: to clean or polish (Acicalarse in reflexive form); to make oneself look good by combing, shaving etc. From Arabic aṣ-ṣaql (الصَّقْل), an instrument used for polishing things.
acicate: spurs or the spikes on spurs; incentive. From Arabic (Muzil) as-siqaT "what takes away weaknesses."
acidaque: Muslim dowry. From Arabic aṣ-ṣadāq (الصّداق), dowry in Islamic law.
acimut: azimuth, an astronomical concept - the angle with which the meridian forms a vertical circle which passes through a point in the globe. From Arabic as-sumut (السُّمُوت) plural of samt سَمْت.
ación: handle on the stirrup. From Arabic as-suyūr (السُّيُور), plural of sayr (سَيْر) "strap" or "belt"
acirate: line of soil used to separate different plots of land; path between two lines of trees. From Arabic aṣ-ṣirāṭ (الصِّرَاط).
acitara or citara: thin wall, normally on a bridge. From Arabic as-sitārah (السِّتَارَة), wall to avoid falls - possibly from the Arabic for curtain, drapes or "hangings".
achacar: to blame. From Arabic tashakkà: to complain or to blame.
adafina: pot used by Jews to cook. It is buried in embers on Friday night, where it cooks until Saturday. From Arabic: dafina "buried", alternative meaning "hidden treasure"
adalid: leader; general of Spanish militia. From Arabic dalil.
adaraja: each of the gaps made by the bricks in a horizontally unfinished wall. From daraja.
adarga: leather shield. From Arabic dāraqa (دارقة) "shield."
adárgama:  flour, rarely used today. From Arabic darmaka.
adarme: small portion of something; type of measurement. From Arabic dirham.
adarvar: to shock. From Arabic dharb "blow." Replaced by pasmar and aturdir in current speech.
adarve: wall of a fortress; protection, defense. From Arabic dharb
adefera: a small, square wall or floor tile. From Arabic add-ddafeera.
adehala: that which is granted or taken as obligatory with the price in the leasing or sale of a property. From Mozarabic ad ihala and originally from Arabic ihala "offering credit."
adelfa: oleander. From Arabic ad-difla (الدِّفْلَى) of the same meaning.
ademán: gesticulation which expresses the will to do something. From Arabic adh-dhamān (الضَّمَان), literally meaning legal guarantees. The change of meaning is due to the exaggerated promises and gesticulations which were offered in such a plea.
ademe: wooden structures used to strengthen tunnels in mines. From Arabic da'm (دَعم), meaning "buttress, support, fortify, pillar, hold up".
adiafa: present or refreshment given to sailors when back from a voyage. From Arabic Diyafa (adh-dhiyāfah الضِّيَافَة) "present of hospitality", the word for "accommodation, hospitality, housing" or "hospitable reception"
adivas: a disease provoking throat inflammation in animals. From Arabic aD-Dibbah "wolverine", which is the old Arabic name for this disease. Most likely the disease lupus, aḍ-ḍa'ab (الذَّأَب)
adive: a type of canid similar to a fox. From Arabic aḍ-ḍi'b (الذِّئْب).
adobe: brick made from clay. From Arabic aṭ-ṭūbah (الطُّوبَة, from Coptic tôbe) of the same meaning, and from ad-dabba.
adoquín: paving-stone, cobble; block. From Arabic Dukkan bench of rock or wood.
ador: in regions where water for irrigation is restricted and shared out by local authorities, irrigation-time for each farm/field. From Arabic dawr.
aduana: customs house; customs. From Arabic diwaan.
aduar: semi-permanent rural settlement, normally used for Gypsies, Bedouins or Amerindians in South America. From Bedouin Arabic duwwar.
adúcar: type of silk made from the outside of the silk-worm's cocoon. From Andalusi Arabic Haduqa.
adufe: tambourine used by Spanish Muslims. Originally from Arabic ad-duff (الدُّفّ), the generic word for tambourine.
adul: in Morocco, assessor of the Cadí (see under letter C, another Arabic loanword). From Arabic ‘adl (عَدْل),  "honorable, trustworthy person" or "fair, impartial".
adula: see dula.
adunia: (adverb) lots. From Andalusi Arabic addunya, originally from classical Arabic ad-dunyā (الدُّنْيَا) "the (whole) world", "the material world"
adutaque: same meaning as adárgama. From Arabic ad-duqāq (الدُّقَاق) "fine flour" or "flour meal".
afán: effort; desire; zeal. From afanar.
afanar: to steal; to work with passion. From Arabic al-fanā‘ (فناء) "extinction, extinction, destruction, vanishing", the notion, emotion of "annihilation through passion", used in poetry or to describe a type of madness
aguajaque: the whitish resin of fennel. From Arabic aw-washaq "contaminated with water."
agüela: Income from interest on loans assigned in public documents; Renta de los derechos sobre préstamos consignados en documento público. From Arabic Hawalah.
ajabeba: Moorish flute. From Classical Arabic ash-shabbābah (الشَّبَّابَة), the generic word for "flute, clarinet".
ajaquefa: Roof. Same origin as Azaquefa (see the word).
ajaraca: Ornamental loop in Andalusian and Arabic architecture. From Andalusi Arabic Ash-sharakah "loop".
ajarafe: terrace. From Classical Arabic saraf "commanding height."
ajebe: Alum; Para rubber tree. From Arabic ash-Shabb.
ajedrea: plant in the genus Satureja (family Lamiaceae), about 30 cm in height, with many branches and dark, narrow leaves. It is cultivated as an ornamental in gardens. From Arabic assariyya or assiriyya, ultimately from Latin satureia.
ajedrez: chess. From Arabic ash shatranj (الشطرنج) which is from Persian Shatranj from the Sanskrit Chaturang (four armed) as was the shape of the original chess board in India
ajenuz: nutmeg flower or Roman Coriander (Nigella sativa). From Andalusi Arabic Shanuz and ultimately Classical Arabic Shuniz.
ajimez: bifora (twin arched window); wooden  balcony with lattice windows. From Arabic shamis.
ajomate: pluricellular alga formed by very thin filaments, without knots, bright and of intense green color. It abounds in fresh waters of Spain. From Classical Arabic gumam, pl. of gumma, "luxurious hair".
ajonjolí: sesame; herbaceous, annual plant of the family of the Pedaliaceae, a meter high, straight stem, serrate and almost triangular leaves, white or rosy corolla, and fruit with four delicate, yellowish, oily and edible capsules and many seeds. From Classical Arabic gulgulān "sesame."
ajorca: bangle; type of gold hoop, silver or another metal, used by the women to adorn the wrists, arms or the feet. From Classical Arabic shuruk, ultimately from the word shirāk "strap."
ajorrar: To drag, to tow. See Jorro.
ajuagas: equine animal ulcers. From Classical Arabic shuqaq.
ajuar: dowry, a collection of household and personal items (clothes, furniture, jewelry etc...) which women in Spain traditionally prepare from a young age for the day in which they marry and move in with their husband. From Arabic shawār, "household utensils".
alacena: cupboard. From Classical Arabic ẖizānah (خزانة).
alacet: foundation of a building. From Classical Arabic asas (أساس).
alacrán: scorpion. From Classical Arabic aqrab (عقرب) of same meaning.
aladar: Tuft of hair which falls on either side of the head. From Arabic idar.
aladroque: Anchovy. From Andalusi Arabic Al Hatruk, "big mouthed".
alafa: wage; pay. From Classical Arabic alafah "subsistence allowance." The word was replaced by sueldo in modern Spanish.
alafia: grace; pardon; mercy. From Andalusian Arabic al afya ultimately from Classical Arabic afiyah (عافية) "health."
alahílca: tapestry to adorn the walls. Perhaps of alailaca from Andalusian Arabic ilaqa, and this of Classical Arabic ilāqah (علاقة) perhaps meaning "hanger."
alajor: Tax which was paid to owners of land where buildings were built. From Arabic Ashur, period of ten days before Easter when debts were paid and alms were given.
alajú: Andalusian cake made of almonds, nuts, pine nuts, bread, spices and cooked honey. From al Hashu "filling".
alamar: A type of decorative attachment which is buttoned on clothing. From Andalusi Arabic Alam, decoration (in clothes).
alambique: alembic, alchemical still consisting of two vessels connected by a tube, used for distilling chemicals. From Arabic al-anbiq "the cup/container holding water", in turn from Greek.
alambor: Two meanings in Spanish with two different etymologies. 1) Embankment, from Andalusi Arabic Harabul "rim", from classical Arabic verb Hawwala, "to alter". 2) Type of orange tree. From Catalan l'ambor, singular of els zambors, derived from Andalusi Arabic Azzambu.
alamín: Village judge who decided on irrigation distribution or official who measured weights. From Arabic al-amin.
alamud: Steel bar used to close windows. From Arabic amud.
alaqueca: A type of blood-coloured quartz. From Arabic 'aqiq. Currently replaced by the word cornalina.
alárabe: Arab. From Andalusi Arabic, maintaining the definite article al arabi.
alarde/alardear: To boast/to show off. From Arabic "show" (ala?ard العرض)
alarife: 1) Architect 2) Builder (in mining) 3) Astute or quick witted person (in Argentina and Uruguay). From Arabic al 'arif: The expert.
alarije (uva): A type of grape. From Arabic al'aris.
alaroz: Crossbar which divides a window or a door. From Arabic al'arud: Obstacle placed to block entry.
alaroza: Fiancée or newly wed wife. From Arabic Andalusi Arabic al-arusa.
alatar: Drug, spice or perfume dealer. From Arabic al attar.
alatrón: Nitrate foam. From Arabic an-nattrun.
alazán/alazano: Reddish cinnamon coloured, used commonly to describe sorrel-coloured horses. From Arabic al-as·hab. From Andalusian Arabic الاسهاب, from Arabic اَصْهَب (aṣ·hab, "reddish, reddish-brown").
alazor: safflower. From Arabic al-usfur.
albacara: Wall around a fortress, within which cattle were normally kept. From Arabic bab al-baqqara "The cattle gate/door". baqara (بقرة) means "cow" in Arabic.
albacea: Executor (of a will). From Andalusi Arabic Sahb al Wassiya (صاحب الوصية); "The owner of the will".
albacora: Albacore. From Arabic al-bakura "premature" or al-bakrah "young camel."
albadena: Type of tunic or silk dress. From Arabic badan: Type of shirt which covers the torso.
albahaca: Basil. From Arabic al-habaqah.
albahío: Pale yellowish colour, used commonly for cattle. From Arabic bahi: "Shining".
albalá: Official document. From Arabic al-bara'ah.
albaida: Anthyllis cystoides (Flowering plant). From Arabic al-baida: "The white one".
albanega: 1) Net used for hair. 2) Rabbit trap. From Arabic al-baniqa.
albañal: Sewer. From Andalusi Arabic al-ballá: "swallower".
albañil: Construction worker. From Andalusi Arabic al-banni. Originally from classical Arabic banna.
albaquía: The remainder. From Arabic al-baqi (الباقي) of the same meaning.
albarán: Invoice. From Arabic al-bara'ah.
albarazo: Vitiligo. From Andalusi Arabic Al-Barash.
albarda: Pack-saddle. From Arabic al-barda'ah.
albardán: Clown or fool. From Andalusi Arabic albardán: "insolent". Originally from Classical Arabic bardan: "Idiot (cold headed)".
albardín: Plant endemic to the Spanish steppes, similar in nature and use to Esparto. From Arabic "al-bardi": "papyrus".
albaricoque: Apricot. From Arabic al-barqouq (البرقوق) "plum" or "early-ripe."
albarrada: 1) Clay vase, see alcarraza. 2) Stone wall. From Arabic al-barradah: "the cooler".
albarrán: 1) Farm boy 2) Shepherd 3) Person with no fixed residence. From Andalusi Arabic al-barrani: "Outsider".
albatoza: Small, covered boat. From Arabic al-gattosha: grebe. Due to the Arabic custom of giving names of birds to vessels.
albayalde: Cerrusite. From Arabic al-bayad.
albéitar: Vet. From Arabic al-baytar.
albenda: Decorated white linen. From Arabic al-band.
alberca: Water deposit for irrigation. In Mexico and Honduras it is also the term of choice for swimming pool. From Arabic al-birka (البِركة) "pond".
albérchigo: Apricot tree. From Andalusi Arabic al-bershiq.
albihar: Mayweed. From Arabic al-bahar.
albitana: 1) Fence to protect plants in gardening. 2) Prolongation of the keel or stern post of a ship. From Arabic al-bitana.
alboaire: The craft of decorating churches and domes with "azulejos". From Andalusi Arabic al-buhaira: lagoon.
albogue: Single-reed clarinet used in Spain. From Arabic al-bûq (البوق): The horn or the trumpet.
alboheza: Malva, from Andalusi Arabic al-hubayza.
albohol: Morning glory, from Andalusi Arabic al-hubuul: "rope".
albollón: Drainage or sewage. From Mozarabic Ballaón and ultimately from Classical Arabic balla'ah.
albóndiga: Meatball; ball. From Arabic al-bunduqa (البندقة) "the ball," from Greek (κάρυον) ποντικόν (káryon) pontikón,  "Pontic [nut]."
albórbola: Joy, celebratory noise. From Arabic walwalah.
alborga: Matweed sandal. From Arabic albúlḡa.
albornía: A type of large vase. From Arabic barniya.
albornoz: Bath-robe. From al-burnos (البرنس); "(bath)robe".
alboronía: A type of Andalusian vegetable stew. From Arabic al buranniya "Buran's (stew)." Buran was the wife of Caliph Ma'moun.
alboroque: 1) A present or gratuity given in exchange for a service. 2) The kind treatment and lavish attention offered and received in anticipation of a commercial transaction. From Andalusi Arabic al-borok, possibly ultimately from Classical Arabic arbun.
alboroto: Riot, joy. Comes from arabism alborozo (joy), from andalusí Arabic al-burúz derived from Classical Arabic al-burūz, "military parade previous to a campaign"; or related to Latin volutāre.
alborozo: Extreme chaos or happiness. From Andalusi Arabic al-buruz: "Military parade prior to an expedition".
albotín: Turpentine Tree. From Arabic butm of the same meaning.
albricias: 1) Term used to congratulate someone. 2) Present or gift provided to a bringer of good news. From Arabic bushra.
albudeca: A bad watermelon. From Andalusi Arabic al batiha.
albufera: Lagoon. From Arabic al buhaira.
albur: This term has a wide range of meanings: 1) Flathead mullet (Spain and Cuba), 2) A card combination in a card game known as Banca, 3) A chance occurrence on which an enterprise hedges its bets, 4) An expression which has a double or hidden meaning (Mexico and Dominican Republic) 4) An amorous affair (Nicaragua), 5) A lie, slander or rumour (Puerto Rico and Honduras). From Arabic al-boori.
alcabala: 1) A tax on commercial transactions. 2) Police checkpoint outside cities and on main roads (Colombia and Venezuela). From Andalusi Arabic al qabala.
alcabor: Hollow interior of a chimney or oven. From Arabic al qabw.
alcabtea: A type of linen. From Arabic al qubtiya, meaning "Egyptian" or "Coptic".
alcacel or alcacer: 1) Green barley 2) A barley field. From Arabic al qasil.
alcachofa: Artichoke. From Arabic al-ẖarshoof of the same meaning.
alcaduz: Water pipe. From Arabic Qâdûs (قادوس) meaning "water-wheel scoop".
alcafar: Limbs of a cuadruped (normally a horse). From Arabic al kafal.
alcahaz: Birdcage. From Arabic qafaṣ (قفص) of the same meaning
alcahuete: Accomplice, pimp, a person who helps another in a love affair, specially an illicit one; gossipy person. Alcahuete comes from Hispanic Arabic alqawwad (the messenger), and this from Classical Arabic qawwad. This "messenger" carried messages to a married woman's lover. By extension it became commonly known as any person who sets up a love affair, generally illicit.
alcaicería: an establishment where silk farmers presented their produce, under the rights reserved to the Muslim rulers in Granada and other towns of the Nasrid Kingdom. From Andalusi Arabic Al-Qaysariya, originally from the Latin Caesarea.
alcaide: a term historically referred to various positions of government authority. In modern Spanish commonly refers to a prison warden. From Arabic al qa'id, "military commander".
alcalde: Mayor. From Arabic al-qadi (the judge). Qadi comes from the verb qada (to judge).
álcali: Alkali. From Arabic qalawi (قلوي) of the same meaning thru Medieval Latin.
alcaller: Clay artisan or his helper. From Andalusi Arabic al qallal.
alcamiz: An obsolete term referring to a list of soldiers. Its etymology is an erroneous transmission of at-taymiz, "Military inspection" in Andalusi Arabic and "Distinction" in Classical Arabic.
alcamonías: Seeds used in spice mixes such as anisseed or cumin. It is also a now obsolete expression referring to the act of hiding things. From Arabic kammuniya, a cumin-based concoction.
alcana: Henna or Henna tree. From Arabic, hinna.
alcaná: Commercial street or neighbourhood. From Arabic qanaah: "Drains or water pipes".
alcancía: Clay money box, penny or piggy bank. From Andalusi Arabic alkanzíyya, derived from classical Arabic kanz: "treasure".
alcándara:  Hook used to hang clothes or fowl. From Arabic Kandarah.
alcandía:  Sorghum. From Andalusi Arabic qatniyya.
alcandora: A type of shirt. From Arabic qandura.
alcanería:  A rural term for a type of artichoke. From Andalusi Arabic al-qannariya, an Arabic rendering of the Latin cannaria.
alcanfor: Camphor. From Andalusi Arabic Al-Kafur.
alcántara/alcantarilla: Drain. From Arabic al-qantarah meaning "bridge".
alcaparra: Caper. From Andalusian Arabic al-kaparra. Via Latin and Greek.
alcaraván: Stone-Curlew. From Andalusian Arabic al-karawan.
alcaravea: Caraway. From Andalusi Arabic al-Karawiya. 
alcarceña: Name given to the Ervil and the Carob. From Andalusi Arabic al-kershana, meaning "the big bellied", due to the plants causing a swelled stomach when consumed in large quantities.
alcarraza: A type of clay container similar to a Spanish Botijo. From Andalusi Arabic al-karraza. Ultimately from Persian Koraz.
alcarria: Of uncertain Arabic etymology. Refers to a flat highland with little vegetation.  
alcatenes: A type of medicine which is mixed with copper sulfate to treat ulcers. From Arabic al-qutn.
alcatara (or alquitara): Alembic. From Arabic root for the verb "to distill" qattara.
alcatifa: An obsolete term for a thin carpet or underlay for carpet. From Arabic al-qatifa.
alcatraz: Cormorant. From Arabic القطرس al-qaṭrās, meaning "sea eagle".
alcaucil: Artichoke. From Spanish Andalusi Arabic alqabsíl[a], that comes from Mozarab diminutive kapićéḻa, and this from Spanish Latin capĭtia, "head". Standard Latin, caput-itis.
alcaudon: Shrike. From Andalusi Arabic al-kaptan.
alcavela/alcavera: Mob, herd, family, tribe. From Arabic al-qabila.
alcayata: Metallic hanger or hook. From Andalusi Arabic al-kayata, originally from Latin Caia
alcazaba: Palace. From Arabic al-qasbah, (قصبة), "the quarter".
alcázar: Citadel; palace. From Arabic al-qasr (القصر) "the citadel," from Latin castrum, "castle," same etymology with Spanish term castro.
alcazuz (or orozuz): Liquorice. From Arabic ‘urúq sús or ‘írq sús, and from classic Arabic irqu [s]sús.
alcoba: Alcove. From Arabic al-qubba "the vault" or "the arch."
alcohela: Endive. From the Andalusi Arabic alkuḥáyla, and this one from the Arabic kuḥaylā'.
alcohol: From Arabic al-kuhul (الكحول), fine powder of antimony sulfide used as eye makeup. Derivate word: alcoholar.
alcolla: Large glass bulb or a Decanter. From Hispanic Arabic alqúlla, and this one from the Arabic qullah.
alcor: Hill. From Hispanic Arabic alqúll, and this one from the Latin collis.
alcora 
alcorcí
alcorque
alcorza
alcotán
alcotana
alcrebite
alcuacil 
alcubilla
alcuña
alcuza
alcuzcuz
alchub 
aldaba
aldea/aldeano: Village / Villager.
aldiza
alefriz
aleja
alejija
alema
alerce
aletría
aleve/alevoso/alevosía: from Hispanic Arabic al'áyb and the latter from Classical Arabic áyb, "defect, blemish, or smudge of infamy"
aleya
alfaba
alfábega
alfadía
alfaguara: Geyser. From Arabic fawwâra (فوارة): "spout, fountain, water jet".
alfahar/alfaharería
alfaida
alfajeme
alfajor: Sweet almond shortbread. From Spanish Arabic fašúr, and this from Persian afšor (juice).
alfalfa: alfalfa hay.  From Hispanic Arabic alfáṣfaṣ[a], from Classical Arabic fiṣfiṣah, and this from Pelvi aspast.
alfaneque: 1) A type of bird, from Arabic al-fanak 2) A tent, from Berber afarag.
alfanje: A type of sword. From Arabic al-janyar "dagger".
alfaque
alfaqueque
alfaquí
alfaquín
alfaraz
alfarda: Two meanings; from Arabic al-farda and from Arabic al-fardda.
alfarero: potter.
alfardón
alfareme
alfarje
alfarrazar
alfaya
alfayate
alfazaque
alféizar: Window ledge. From Arabic al-hayzar, "The one which takes possession".
alfeñique: 1) Weakling. 2) A type of sweet consumed in Spain and Mexico. From Andalusi Arabic Al-Fanid. Ultimately from Persian and Sanskrit.
alferecía
alferez
alferraz
alferza: Piece, known as Vizir in other languages, corresponding to the modern chess "queen" (though far weaker), from which modern chess developed in medieval Spain. From Andalusi Arabic Al Farza, ultimately from Persian Farzan, "the guardian".
alficoz
alfil: Bishop, in chess. From Arabic al-fiyl (الفيل) "The elephant."
alfilel/alfiler
alfinge
alfitete
alfiz
alfolí
alfombra: Carpet. Two meanings; from Arabic al-jumra and from Arabic al-humra.
alfóncigo: Pistachio. From Arabic al-fustuq.
alfóndiga
alforfón
alforja: Saddlebag. From Arabic al-khurj ( الخرج ) "saddle-bag", portmanteau.
alforre
alforrocho
alforza
alfóstiga
alfoz: Neighborhood, district. From Arabic hauz (حوز) meaning "Precinct" or "City limits".
algaba
algadara
algaida
algalaba 
algalia
algalife 
algar
algara
algarada
algarabía: Incomprehensible talk; gabble; gibberish. From Arabic al-'arabiya: "Arabic".
algarivo
algarazo: Short rainstorm. From Arabic al 'ard: "cloud".
algarrada
algarrobo: Carob. From Arabic al-kharouba "the carob."
algavaro
algazafán 
algazara
algazul
álgebra: Algebra. From Latin algebræ from Arabic al-jabr, meaning "completion, rejoining", from the name of al-Khwarizmi's book Hisab al-jabr w’al-muqabala "The Calculus of Completion and Equality."
algodón: Cotton. From Arabic "al-qúţun (قطن)", meaning "The cotton", "Egyptian", "Coptic".
algorfa
algoritmo: algorithm, comes from the name of Muhammad ibn Musa al-Khwarizmi, محمد بن موسى الخوارزمي, famous mathematician, through its Latinized prounuciation Algorithmi.
algorza:
alguacil: Sheriff. From Arabic "al-wazîr (الوزير)", meaning "Minister".
alguaquida: fuel for a fire. From Arabic waqîda (وقيدة) meaning "Fuel"
alguaza: Window or door hinge.From Arabic wasl "juncture".
alhadida: From Arabic "al-hadida" (الحديدة), meaning Copper sulfate. 
alhaite: Jewel. From Arabic al hayt "string". الخيط
alhaja: Jewel. From Arabic al-hajah "the valuable thing." الحاجة
alhamar: Red mattress or bed cover. From Arabic hanbal, "fur bedcover". Also from Arabic Alhamar / Al-Ahmar "red".
alhamel: Beast of burden or human porter, in Andalusian Spanish. From Arabic hammal.  الحامل، حمّال
alhamí: Stone bench normally covered with azulejos. Refers to the Grenadine town of Alhama.
alhandal: Colocynth. From Arabic Alhandhal. الحنظل
alhanía: 1) Bedroom 2) Cupboard 3) A type of small mattress. From Andalusi Arabic al haniyya, "alcove".
alhaquín: Weaver. From Arabic plural Al Hayikeen, "weavers". الحيّاكين
alharaca: Violent reaction to a small issue. From Arabic haraka. حركة
alhavara: Flour. From Arabic huwara.
alhelí: Aegean Wallflower. From Arabic hiri.
alheña: Spanish word for Henna and the plant from which it is derived.
alholva: Fenugreek. From Arabic hulbah.
alhorí: Same meaning and etymology as more commonly used term alfolí.
alhorre: 1) Feaces of a newborn child. From Arabic hur, "feaces". 2) Common skin rash in babies, nappy rash. Commonly used in expression "Yo te curaré el alhorre!" when threatening to beat a child. From Arabic shakatu el hurr, "skin infection".
alhorría: (or ahorría): Expression used for when a slave is freed. From Arabic al-hurriya, "freedom".
alhucema: Lavender. From Arabic huzama.
alhuceña: Woodruff. From Arabic uhshina.
aliara: Drinking horn. From Andalusian Arabic al fiyara.
alicante: Vernacular name of two different types of poisonous snakes present in Spain and Northern Mexico respectively. From Arabic al aqrab, "scorpion".
alicatar: To till. From Arabic qat, "to cut".
alicate: Pliers. From Arabic laqaat, "tongs".
alidada: Alidade. From Andalusian Arabic al'idada.
alifa: Sugar cane, two years old, in Andalusian and Mexican Spanish. From Arabic halifa "successor".
alifafe: 1) Light indisposition. 2) Type of tumor which develops on the legs of horses from excessive work. From Arabic ifash "sowing bag".
alifara
alijar
alimara
alioj
alirón
alizace
alizar
aljaba
aljabibe
aljama
aljamía/aljamiado: Medieval Romance Spanish or Mozarabic written in Arabic script.
aljaraz
aljarfa
aljébana
aljerife
aljez
aljibe
aljófar/aljofarar
aljofifa
aljor (or aljez)
aljuba
aljuma
añagaza
almacabra
almacén: Deposit, dry goods store. From Arabic al-majzan of makhzan (المخزن) "the storage" or "the depot."
almacería
almáciga
almadén
almádena: sledgehammer. From Andalusian Arabic al-māṭana (الْمَاطَنَة‎) "sledgehammer."
almadía
almadraba: Tuna fishing in Andalusia and particularly in Cadiz province. From Andalusi Arabic Al-madraba, "place where to hit", in reference to the fishing technique.
almadraque
almagazén
almagra
almahala
almaizar
almaja
almajaneque
almajar
almajara
almalafa
almanaque: almanac (see etymology section in the article for further discussion). From Andalusian Arabic almanáẖ "calendar", from Arabic munāẖ "caravan stop", or from Greek almenichiakon "calendar."
almancebe: type of river fishing net, from Spanish Arabic al-manṣába, bank.
almarada
almarbate
almarcha
almarjo
almarrá
almarraja or almarraza
almártaga: two meanings, from al-marta'a and al martak.
almástica
almatroque
almazara: Olive press. From Arabic "al-ma'sarah" (المعصرة), "juicer".
almazarrón
almea: two meanings, from almay'a and alima.
almejía
almenara: two meanings, from al-manara and al-minhara.
almez
almíbar: sugar syrup, juice concentrate.
almicantarat
almijar
almijara
almijarra
almimbar
alminar
almiraj/almiraje/almiral 
almirez
almirón: Dandelion. From Andalusian Arabic al mirun.
almizate
almizcle/almizque
almocadén
almocafre
almocárabe
almocela
almocrebe
almocrí
almodón
almófar
almofariz
almofía
almofrej/almofrez
almogama
almogávar
almohada: Pillow, from Arabic al-makhada (المخده) with the same meaning.
almoharrefa
almohaza
almojábana
almojama: see mojama
almojarife
almojaya
almona
almoneda: Sale or auction. From Arabic munadah.
almoraduj/almoradux
almorávide
almorí
almoronía: see alboronía.
almotacén
almotalafe
almotazaf/almotazán
almozala/almozalla
almud
almuédano
almuerzo: Lunch. Arabic al- + Latin morsus (bite).
almunia: an agricultural settlement, from  meaning desire. (see Article in Spanish).
alpargata
alpechín
alpiste
alquería: Farmhouse. From Arabic al-qaria "the village."
aloque
aloquín
alpargata
alquequenje
alquería
alquermes
alquerque: Two meanings, from al-qirq and al-qariq.
alquez
alquezar
alquibla
alquicel
alquiler: Rent. From Arabic Al kira' (الكراء)
alquimia: alchemy, from Arabic al-kīmiyā' ( or ) via Medieval Latin alchemia, from the Late Greek term khēmeía (χημεία), also spelled khumeia (χυμεία) and khēmía (χημία), meaning 'the process of transmutation by which to fuse or reunite with the divine or original form'.
alquinal
alquitira
alquitrán: tar, from Arabic اَلْقِطْرَان al-qitran.
alrota
altabaca
altamía
altramuz: Lupin bean. From Arabic at-turmus.
alubia: Pea, bean. From Arabic lubiya.
aludel
aluquete/luquete
alloza
amán
ámbar: amber, from Arabic ʿanbar , meaning  "anything that floats in the sea", via Middle Latin ambar.
ámel
amín
amirí
anacalo
anacora
anafaga
anafalla/anafaya
anafe
anaquel
andorra
andrajo
anea
anejir
anúteba
añacal
añacea/añacear
añafea
añafil
añagaza
añascar
añazme
añil: Ultimately from Sanskrit nilah, "dark blue".
arabí
arancel
arbellón/arbollón
archí
argadillo
argamandel
argamula
argán
argel
argolla
arguello/arguellarse
arije
arimez
arjorán
arnadí
arrabá
arrabal
arracada
arráez
arrayán
arrecife
arrejaque/arrejacar
arrelde
arrequife
arrequive
arriate
arricés
arroba
arrobda 
arrocabe
arrope
arroz: Rice.
áscar/áscari
asequi 
asesino: Assassin. From Arabic hashshshin "someone who is addicted to hashish (marijuana)." Originally used to refer to the followers of the Persian Hassan-i-Sabah (حسن صباح), the Hashshashin.
atabaca
atabal
atabe
atacar: To tie, to button up. From Andalusi Arabic tákka, originally from classical Arabic tikkah, ribbon used to fasten clothes.
atacir
atafarra/ataharre
atafea
atahona
atahorma
ataifor
ataire
atalaya
atalvina
atambor
atanor
atanquía
ataracea
atarazana
atarfe
atarjea
atarraga
atarraya
ataúd: Coffin.
ataujía
ataurique
atifle
atijara
atíncar
atoba
atocha
atracar: To assault, to burgle, to dock a boat, to get stuck, to gorge oneself with food, to cheat, to get stuck. From Arabic Taraqa, "To rise".
atríaca/atriaca: Obsolete word.
atún: Tuna fish. From the Arabic word al-tuna (التونه).
atutía
auge: surge, rise, boom.
aulaga
avería
azabache
azabara
azacán
azacaya
azache
azafate/azafata
azafrán: Saffron. From Arabic اَلزَّعْفَرَان az-za`farān, from Persian زعفران zaferān or زرپران zarparān gold strung.
azahar: White flower, especially from the orange tree. From Spanish Arabic azzahár, and this from Classic Arabic zahr, flowers.
azalá
azamboa
azándar
azaque: Alms-giving or religious tax in Islam. From Arabic zakāt (Arabic: زكاة [zæˈkæː], "that which purifies"[1]). See article zakat.
azaquefa: Covered portico or patio. From Andalusi Arabic assaqifa, "portico", originally from Arabic as-saqf (السَّقْف), meaning "roof" or "upper covering of a building".
azar: Luck; chance. From Arabic az-zahr "the dice" or North African Arabic az-zhar "luck".
azarbe
azarcón
azarja
azarnefe
azarote 
azófar
azofra/azofrar
azogue: Two meanings, from az-za'uq and from as-suq.
azolvar
azorafa
azote: Smacking, beating, scourge. From Arabic sawṭ.
azotea: Flat roof or terrace. From Andalusi Arabic assutáyha, diminutive of sath, "terrace" in Classical Arabic.
azoya 
azúcar: Sugar. From Arabic (سكر) sukkar of the same meaning, from Persian shekar.
azucarí
azucena
azuche
azud
azufaifa/azufaifo
azul: Blue. From Arabic lāzaward, ultimately from Sanskrit.
azulaque (or zulaque)
azulejo: Handpainted glazed floor and wall tiles, from Arabic az-zellīj, a style of mosaic tilework made from individually hand-chiseled tile pieces set into a plaster base, from zalaja meaning "to slide". See also alboaire and alhamí.
azúmbar
azumbre: Measurement for liquids equivalent to around two litres. From Del Andalusi Arabic aTTúmn, and this from Classical Arabic: Tum[u]n, "an eighth".

B
babucha: Slippers. From Arabic baboush (بابوش), derived from Persian "papoosh" (پاپوش) literally meaning "foot covering". The transition from Persian "p" to Arabic "b" occurs due to lack of the letter p in the Arabic alphabet. "Pa-" in Persian means foot and "poosh" means covering. Persian "pa" or foot shares the same root with other Indo-European languages, i.e. Latin pede[m], French "pied", Spanish "pie" and "pata", etc.
badal: Cut of meat from the back and ribs of cattle, close to the neck. From Andalusi Arabic bad'a "Calf muscle" derived from classical Arabic bad'ah "piece".
badán: Trunk of an animal. From Arabic badan.
badana: 1) Sheepskin, 2) Hat lining, 3) Lazy person. From Arabic bitana, "lining".
badea: 1) Watermelon or melon of bad quality. 2) Insipid cucumber, 3) Weak person, 4) Unimportant thing. From Arabic battiha "bad melon".
badén: Dip in land, road, sidewalk or ford. From Arabic bāṭin (بطين) "sunken" (land).
bagarino: Free or hired sailor, as opposed to a press-ganged or enslaven one. Same origin as baharí.
bagre: a freshwater fish that has no scales and has a chin. From Arabic baghir or baghar.
baharí: Bird of prey. From Arabic bahri: "from the sea".
baja: Pasha, Turkish officer or governor of high rank. From Arabic basha ultimately from Turkish pasha of the same meaning.
baladí: 1) Unimportant thing or matter. 2) Something of the land our country. From Arabic baladiy "From the country".
balaj/balaje: Purple ruby. From Arabic Balahshi: From Balahshan (region in central Asia where these stones are found).
balate
balda (and baldío)
baldar
balde: 1) Free. 2) Without cause. 3) In vain. From Arabic batil "false" or "useless."
bancal
baño
baraka: Heavenly providence or unusual luck. From Moroccan Arabic. Recently introduced word.
barbacana
barcino
bardaje
bardoma/bardomera
barragán
barrio/barriada: Area, district or neighbourhood in a town. From Arabic barri "outside".
bata: either from Arabic batt or French ouate.
batán
batea
baurac
bayal
belez
bellota: Acorn, the fruit or seed of the oak tree. From Arabic ball-luta (بلوط) of the same meaning.
ben
benimerín
benjui
berberí
berberís
bereber
berenjena/berenjenal: eggplant, aubergine, from Arabic بَاذِنْجَان (bāḏenjān), from Persian بادنجان (bâdenjân) of the same meaning.
bezaar/bezoar
biznaga
bocací
bodoque/bodocal
bófeta
bórax: Borax, from Arabic word bawraq (بورق), from Persian bure of the same meaning.
borní
boronía
botor
bujía
bulbul
burche
buz
buzaque

C
cabila: Tribe of Berbers or Bedouins. From Arabic qabila "tribe."
cachera
cadí: From Arabic qādiy / qādī (قَاضِي), a "judge", type of public officer appointed to hear and try causes in a court of justice; same etymology with alcalde.
cadira
café: Coffee. From Arabic qahwa (قهوة) of the same meaning.
cáfila
cafiz (or cahiz)
cafre
caftán
cáid (same origin as alcaide)
caimacán
calabaza: Pumpkin or squash. From Arabic qerabat (قربات), plural of qerbah (قربة), meaning wineskin.
calafate/calafatear
calahorra
calí: same root as álcali.
cálibo/calibre
cambuj
camocán
canana: Cartridge belt.
cáncana/cancanilla
cáncano
cande: in azúcar cande.
canfor
caraba
cárabe
cárabo: Owl; dog. Taken from Arabic qaraab and kalb "dog" (kalaab "dogs"), respectively.
caracoa
caramida
caramuzal
caravana
caravasar
carcajada/carcajear
carcax
carmen/carme: From Spanish Arabic kárm, and this from Classical Arabic karm, vine.
carmesí: Crimson, bluish deep red. From Arabic quirmizi.
carmín
carraca
carrafa
cártama/cártamo
catán
catifa
cazurro
cebiche
cebtí
ceca
cedoaria
cegatero
cegrí
ceje
celemí/celemín/celeminero
cenacho
cendolilla
cenefa
ceneque
cení
cenia
cenit: zenith, from Arabic samt سَمْت, same etymology with acimut.
cequí
cerbatana
cero: Zero. From Arabic sifr of the same meaning.
cetís
ceutí
chafariz
chafarote
chaleco
charrán
chifla
chilabai: From Moroccan Arabic.
chiquero
chirivía
chisme: Gossip.
chivo
choz
chupa
chuzo
cianí
cibica
cica
cicalar
cicatear
cicatero: different root to cicatear.
ciclán
ciclar
ciclatón
cid
cifaque
cifra/cifrar
címbara
cimboga
cimitarra
circón
citara
civeta/civeto
coba/cobista
cofa
coima
coime
colcótar
cora
corán: from qur'aan (قرآن), the Muslim Holy Book.
corbacho
corma
cotonía
cubeba
cúrcuma
curdo
cuscuta

D, E
dado: Dice, cube or stamp. From Classical Arabic a'dad "numbers."
daga - dagger
dahír
daifa
dante
darga (adarga): Shield.
dársena: Dock / basin.
daza
descafilar
destartalado
dey
dirham
diván: Divan / couch. From Arabic from Persian دیوان dēvān (="place of assembly", "roster"), from Old Persian دیپی dipi (="writing, document") + واهانم vahanam (="house"). This is a recent loanword and directly entered Spanish via Persian, as [v] sound in دیوان dēvān is a modern Persian pronunciation. 
droga: Drug.
druso
dula/dular
edrisí
ejarbe
elche
elemí
elixir: from al-ʾiksīr (الإكسير) through Medieval Latin, which in turn is the Arabization of Greek xērion (ξήριον) "powder for drying wounds" (from ξηρός xēros "dry").
embelecar/embeleco
emir (or amir)
encaramar
enchufar/enchufe: 1) To plug in/plug; 2) To connect, 3) To offer an unmerited job or a post through personal connections. From Andalusi Arabic Juf derived from Classical Arabic jawf "stomach; internal cavity".
engarzar: To set/thread.
enjalma
enjarje
enjeco
escabeche: Pickle or marinade. From Arabic as-sukbaj. Originally from Persian Sekba.
escafilar (see descafilar)
escaque/escaquear
espinaca: Spinach.
exarico

F, G
faca
falagar
falca
falleba
faltriquer: Pocket.
falúa/faluca
fanega/hanega
fanfarrón
faranga (or haragán): Lazy, idler, loafer.
farda
fardacho
farfán
fárfara
farnaca
farota
farruco: Insolent or "cocky". From Andalusian Arabic Farrouj, "Cock".
felús
fetua
fez
fideo
filelí
foceifiza
fondolí
fondac/fonda
fulano: "any one" without naming, X of people. From Arabic Fulan.
fustal
fustete
gabán
gabela
gacel/gacela
gafetí
galacho
galanga
galbana
gálibo
galima
gandula/gandula
gañan
garbi: Sirocco wind.
garama
garbino
gardacho
garfa
gárgol
garra
garrafa
garrama
garroba
gazpacho
gilí
gomer
granadí
grisgrís
guadamací
guájara
guájete
guala
guarismo: figure, character. From the name of Muhammad ibn Musa al-Khwarizmi, محمد بن موسى الخوارزمي, famous mathematician, through its Latinized prounuciation Algorithmi, same etymology with algoritmo.
guifa
guilla
gumía
gurapas

H, I
habiz: Donation of real estate under certain conditions to muslim religious institutions. From Classical Arabic: ḥabīs: amortized.
habús: Same meaning as habiz has in Morocco. From Arabic ḥubūs, "property belonging to the deceased used for charity".
hachís: Hashish. From Classical Arabic Hashish, "grass". This is a recent loanword influenced by written form , wherein hachís is pronounced [], since <h> is always silent in the beginning of Spanish, and [x] (voicless velar fricative) which is closer to [h] did not exist yet in Old Spanish; the [] sound in Arabic like in the word hashish existed in Old Spanish, that evolved to [x] in Modern Spanish ([h] in other dialects of Modern Spanish) and [] in loanwords in Spanish is pronounced either [] or [s].
hacino: Miser or from Andalusian Arabic ḥazīn.
hadruba: Hump (on someone's back): From Andalusian Arabic ḥadúbba.
hafiz: Guard or minder. From Andalusian Arabic ḥāfiẓ.
hálara: Same meaning and etymology as fárfara. 1) Interior lining of egg. 2) Coldsfoot. From Andalusian Arabic falḡalála.
hallulla: 1)A type of bread or bun consumed in Spain and parts of Hispanic America. 2) Nausea (Eastern Andalusia only) From Andalusian Arabic ḥallún.
hamudí: Descendants of Ali Ben Hamud, founders of the Málaga and Algeciras Taifas during the 11th century.
haragán: 1) Someone who refuses to work. 2) In Cuba and Venezuela, a type of mop. From Andalusian Arabic: khra kan: "Was shit".
harambel: See "arambel".
harbar
harén
harma
harón
Hasaní
hasta: "Until". From Arabic hatta (same meaning). Influenced by Latin phrase 'ad ista'
hataca
hazaña
he: Adverb used in following manner: "he aquí/ahí/allí": Here it is/there it is. From Arabic haa.
hégira
hobacho/hobacha
holgazán: Lazy person. From Arabic Kaslan. Influenced by Holgar.
holgar
hoque/oque
horro/horra
imam, imán
imela
islam

J, K
jabalí : Wild Boar. From Arabic jebeli: From the mountains. Perhaps originally from Khanzeer Jebelí: Mountain Pig.
jabalón
jábega
jabeca
jabeque
jabí : A type of apple and type of grape. From Andalusi Arabic sha‘bí, a type of apple.
jácara
jácena
jacerino
jadraque
jaez
jaguarzo
jaharí
jaharral
jaharrar
jaima
jaique
jalear
jalma (or enjalma)
jaloque
jamacuco
jametería
jámila
japuta
jaque
jaqueca: Migraine. From Arabic Shaqiqa, with same meaning.
jáquima
jara
jarabe: Syrup. From Arabic Sharab. Usually in the context of cough syrup or linctus.
jaraíz
jarcha
jareta
jaricar
jarifo/jarifa
jarquía
jarra: Pitcher or other pot with handle(s). From ǧarrah, same as English jar.
jatib
jazarino/jazarina
jazmín: jasmine. From Arabic yasmin (يسمين) then from the Persian word (same word).
jebe
jeliz
jemesía
jeque: From Arabic shaikh or sheikh, older
jerife: From Arabic sharif, noble, respected.
jeta: Snout, face, cheek (in both literal and figurative sense). From Arabic khatm: "snout".
jifa
jinete
jirafa: giraffe. From ziraffa of the same meaning.
jirel
jofaina: a wide and shallow basin for domestic use. From ǧufaynah.
jofor
jorfe
joroba
jorro
juba/aljuba/jubón
julepe
jurdía
jurel
kermes

L, M
laca: resinous substance tapped from the lacquer tree. From Arabic lak, taken from Persian lak, ultimately from Sanskrit laksha literally meaning "one hundred thousand" referring to the large number of insects that gather and sap out all the resin from the trees.
lacre
lapislázuli: lapis lazuli, a deep blue mineral. From Arabic lazaward from Persian lagvard or lazward, ultimately from Sanskrit rajavarta literally meaning "ringlet of the king."
latón: brass. From Arabic latun from Turkish altın "gold."
laúd: lute. From Arabic al 'ud  "the lute."
lebeche: Southeasterly wind on the Mediterranean coast of Spain. From Andalusi Arabic Labash.
lebení: a Moorish beverage prepared from soured milk. From Arabic labani  "dairy."
leila: from Arabic layla  "night."
lelilí: Shouts and noise made by moors when going into combat or when celebrating parties. From Arabic lā ʾilāha ʾillā-llāh: There is no god but Allah; Ya leilí : Night of mine; ya ʿayouni : My eyes.
lima: lime. From Arabic limah of the same meaning.
limón: lemon. From laymoon, derived from the Chinese word limung.
loco: crazy. From Arabic lawqa "fool."
macabro
macsura
madraza
magacén
magarza/magarzuela
maglaca
maharon/maharona
maharrana/marrana/marrano
mahozmedín
maimón
majareta
majzén
mamarracho
mameluco
mamola
mandeísmo
mandil
maquila
marabú
maravedí
marcasita
marchamo
márfega
marfil
marfuz/a
margomar
marjal
marlota
marojo
maroma
marrano pig; cf. Arabic muharram "forbidden".
marras
márraga
masamuda: (adj) Individual from the Berber Masmuda tribe, from which originate the Almohades, a movement which ruled Spain and North Africa in the 12th century. From Arabic: Masamuda.
matafalúa
matalahúga/matalahúva: Aniseed, from Andalusi Arabic habbat halwa, "sweet seed".
mártaga
máscara
matarife
mate
matraca
matula
mauraca
mazamorra: Word to designate a number of bread or cereal based dishes typical of Southern Spain and parts of Hispanic America. From Andalusi Arabic Pishmat.
mazapán
mazarí
mazarrón
mazmodina
mazmorra: Dungeon. From Arabic matmura "silo".
mazorca: corn cob; roll of wool or cotton. From Andalusi Arabic: Masurqa, derived from classical Arabic Masura : a tube used as a bobbin (sewing) .
meca: Place which is attractive because of a particular activity. From Arabic Makkah.
mechinal
mejala
mejunje
mendrugo: Piece of dry or unwanted bread, often reserved to give to beggars. From Andalusi Arabic Matruq "Marked/Touched".
mengano/mengana: Expression of similar meaning as fulano or zutano, used always after the former but after the latter, meaning "whoever". From Arabic man kan meaning "whoever".
mequetrefe: Nosy or useless person. From Andalusi Arabi qatras meaning person of boastful demeanor.
mercal
metical
mezquino
mía: A military term, formerly designating a regular native unit composed of 100 men in the Spanish protectorate of northern Morocco; by analogy, any colonial army. From Arabic Miʿah: one hundred.
mihrab:
miramamolín
moaxaja
mogataz
mogate
moharra: tip of the sword. From muharraf, meaning "beached".
moharracho
mohatra
mohedal
mohino
mojarra: Refers to fish in the Gerreidae order. From Arabic muharraf.
mojama (originally almojama): Delicacy of phoenician origin from the region of Cadiz. It consists of filleted salt-cured tuna. From the Arabic al mushama: "momified or waxed".
mojí
momia
mona
monfí
morabito
moraga
morapio
mozárabe
mudéjar
muftí
mujalata
mulato: Perhaps from Muwallad, as with the Muladi. Walad means, "descendant, offspring, scion; child; son; boy; young animal, young one". According to DRAE, from latin mulus mulo (mule), in the sense of hybrid.
mulquía: Owned/Property.  From "Mulkiyya"
muslim / muslime: (Adjective) Muslim. A rare alternative to musulmán. From Arabic Muslim.

N, O, P, Q
nabí: Prophet among arabs. From Arabic nabiy.
nácar: Innermost of the three layers of a seashell. From Catalan nacre, derived from Arabic naqra, small drum.
nácara: Type of small metallic drum used historically by the Spanish cavalry. Same etymology as nacar.
nadir: Nadir, the point on the celestial sphere opposite the zenith directly below the observer. From nadheer.
nádir: In Morocco, administrator of a religious foundation.
nagüela: Small hut for human habitation. From Andalusi Arabic nawalla: hut.
naife: High quality diamond. From Andalusi Arabic nayif. Originally from classical Arabic na'if: excellent.
naipe: Playing card. From Catalan naíp. Originally from Arabic ma'ib.
naranja: Orange. from Arabic nāranja, fr Persian nārang, fr Sanskrit nāranga, fr a Dravidian language akin to Tamil naŗu "fragrant".
narguile
natrón
nazarí: Related to the Nasrid kingdom or dynasty of Granada.
neblí: Subspecies of the peregrine falcon, valued in the art of falconry. Possibly from Andalusi Arabic burni.
nenúfar: Water-lily. From Arabic naylufar from Persian nilofer, niloofar, niloufar.
nesga:
noria: Watermill, Ferris wheel. From Arabic na'urah.
nuca: Nape of the neck. From Arabic nuḵāʿ , .
ojalá: "I hope"; "I wish that...". From law šhaʾ allāh "If God wills."
¡ole! (or olé): The most famous expression of approval, support or encouragement, said to have come from wa-llah , "by Allah!". However, its proposed Arabic origin is disputed and it is described as "falsos arabismos" (false Arabisms) by  the Spanish Arabist Federico Corriente in his Diccionario de Arabismos y Voces Afines en Iberorromance. 
omeya: adj. Related to the Umayyad.
orozuz
ox: Expression to scare away wild and domesticated birds. From Andalusi Arabic Oosh.
papagayo
quermes
quilate/quirate: Carat or Karat. From Andalusi Arabic Qirat.
quilma
quina: Galbanum (a type of aromatic gum resin. From Classical Arabic al qinnah.
quintal: weight unit of about 46 kg. In its current use under the metric system, it represents 100 kg. From Arabic Qintar  "referring to a large number similar objects or an object which is large in its size.

R, S, T
rabadán: A rural position. One who oversees the training of shepherds on a farm. From Andalusian Arabic rab aḍ-ḍān (رب الضأن) "lord/master of the lambs."
rabal
rabazuz
rabel
rábida
rafal
rafe
ragua
rahez
ramadán
rambla: A ravine; a tree-lined avenue. From Arabic ramlah (رملة) "sand."
rauda
rauta
real: Military encampment; plot where a fair is organized; (in Murcia region) small plot or garden. From Arabic rahl: camping.
rebato
rebite
recamar
recua
redoma
rehala
rehalí
rehén: Hostage or captive. From Arabic , captive, ransom.
rejalgar: realgar. From Andalusi Arabic reheg al-ghar: "powder of the cave"
requive
resma
retama
rincón: Corner. From Andalusi Arabic rukan, derived from classical Arabic Rukn, or perhaps related to French recoin.
robda
robo (or arroba)
roda
romí/rumí
ronzal
roque: rook (chess piece), from Arabic روخ rukh, from Persian رخ rukh.
sajelar
salema
sandía: Watermelon. From Arabic Sindiya "from Sindh (province of Pakistan)".
sarasa: Homosexual or effeminate man. From "Zaraza".
sarraceno
sebestén
secácul
serafín
siroco
sofí
sófora
soldán
soltaní
sufí
sura
tabal (or atabal)
tabaque
tabefe
tabica
tabique
taca
tafurea
tagarino/tagarina
tagarnina
taha
tahalí
tahona
tahúr
taifa: Refers to an independent Muslim-ruled principality, an emirate or petty kingdom, of which a number formed in the Al-Andalus (Moorish Iberia) after the final collapse of the Umayyad Caliphate of Córdoba in 1031. Used in numerous expressions. Can also mean 1) a faction 2) a group of people of ill judgement. 3) un reino de Taifas (a kingdom of Taifas) can also refer to a chaotic or disorderly state of affairs. From classical Arabic Ta'ifah: faction.
tajea
talco
talega
talvina
támara
tamarindo
tambor
tara
taracea
taraje: Salt Cedar. From Arabic Tarfah.
tarasí
tarbea
tarea: Task. From Arabic ṭaríḥaand root , "to throw".
tareco
tarida
tarifa
tarima
tarquín
tarraya
taza: cup. From Tasa.
tértil
tíbar
tochibí
tomín
toronja
toronjil
trafalmejas
truchimán/na
trujamán/na
tuera
tumbaga
Tunecí
turbit
turquí (in Azul Turquí)
tutía (or atutía)

V, X, Y, Z
vacarí: from Arabic baqari "bovine."
valencí: Uva Valencia. A type of grape from Murcia region in South East Spain.
velmez: from Arabic malbas "clothing."
verdín: Spontaneous growth of grass or sprouting. From Arabic bardi (Same etymology as albardín). Influenced by Spanish word "Verde".
visir: vizier. From Arabic wazir  "minister," recent loanword. Same etymology with alguacil.
yébel: from Arabic jabal (جبل) "mountain"; same etymology as jabalí.
zabalmedina: in the Middle Ages, judge with civil and criminal jurisdiction in a city. From Arabic ṣāḥib al-madīna (صاحب المدينه) "Chief of the City."
zabarcera: women who sells fruits and other food. Same origin as abacero
zabazala: imam who leads Islamic prayer. From Arabic  ṣāḥib aṣ-ṣalāh (صاحب الصلاه) "leader of prayer."
zabazoque: same meaning as almotacén. From Arabic ṣāḥib as-sūq (صاحب السوق) "leader of the market."
zábila: aloe vera (used mainly in Hispanic America) From Andalusi Arabic sabíra, originally from classical Arabic Sibar, same etymology with acíbar.
zabra: type of vessel used in the Bay of Biscay in the Middle Ages and the beginning of the Modern Age. From Arabic zauraq.
zacatín: in some villages, a square where clothes are sold. From saqqatin, plural of saqqat: seller of clothes.
zafar: a number of meanings in Spain and Hispanic American countries: To free, to untie, to ignore, to unknit among others. From Arabic azaHa: to take away.
zafarí: Granada zafarí: a type of pomegranate. Higo zafarí: a type of fig. From Arabic Safr.
zafariche: Structure used for placing clay urns. Same etymology as jaraíz (see above).
zafio: Uncouth. From Andalusi Arabic Fellah safi: "Mere peasant".
zafrán: See Azafran.
zaga: Backside of something. Cargo on the back of a truck. From Arabic Saqah: Rear, rearguard.
zagal: A boy. From Andalusian Arabic zaḡāl (زغال), traditional Arabic zuḡlūl (زغلول) with the same meaning.
zagaya (or azagaya)
zagua
zaguán: Vestibule, foyer, entry-way. From Andalusian Arabic ʾisṭiwān (إِسْطِوَان‎), traditional Arabic ʾusṭuwāna (أسطوانة) "pillar."
zagüía: A zawiya. From Arabic zāwiyah (زاوية‎) "corner."
zaharrón
zahén
zahón
zahora: (Mainly used in Spanish region of La Mancha): Large meal accompanied by dancing or partying. From Arabic Islamic term suhoor.
zahorí
zaida
zaino
zala
zalamelé
zalea/zalear
zalema/zalama
zalmedina: Same meaning and origin as zabalmedina.
zalona
zamacuco
zambra: Traditional festivity of the Moriscos in Spain which is maintained by the Gypsy community of Sacromonte, Granada. From Andalusi Arabic Zamra, originally from classical Arabic Zamr.
zanahoria: carrot, presumably from Andalusi Arabic safunariyya (سَفُنَّارْيَة), via Classical Arabic: isfanariyya (إِسْفَنَارِيَّة), ultimately from Ancient Greek σταφυλίνη.
zaque: Leather recipient for wine or extracting water from a well. Drunken person. From Andalusi Arabic zaqq. Originally from classical Arabic ziqq.
zaquizamí
zaragüelles
zaranda/zarandillo/zarandaja
zarandear: To shake vigorously / push around / toss about. From Zaranda.
zaratán: Breast cancer. From the Arabic saratan: crab.
zarazán:
zarco
zarracatín
zarzahán: Astrakhan, a type of fleece used in making outerwear. From Arabic zardakhān (زردخان).
zatara
zéjel: a form of Arabic poetry. From arabic zajal (زجل).
zoco: market in an Arab country. From Arabic sūq (سوق) "market."  Not to be confused with other meanings of zoco.
zofra
zorzal: An intelligent person. From Andalusi Arabic zurzāl (زورزال‎), originally from classical Arabic zurzūr (زرزور) "thrush".
zubia: Place where a large amount of water flows. From Arabic Zubya.
zulaque
zulla
zumaque: sumac. From Arabic summāq (سماق) of the same meaning.
zumo: fruit juice. From Arabic zum.
zuna: Sunnah, from Arabic Sunnah
zurriaga or zurriago: Refers to a type of whip and to a lark. From Andalusi Arabic surriyaqa

Words with a coincidental similarity to Arabic and false arabisms

 el: The Spanish definite articles el / la / lo / los / las, like most definite articles in the Romance languages, derive from the Latin demonstratives ille / illa / illud. The similarity to the Arabic article al is a mere coincidence. The exact Spanish article al is a contraction of a el, translated as "to the."
 usted: The formal second-person pronoun usted is derived from a shortening of the old form of address Vuestra merced, as seen in dialectal Spanish vosted, Catalan vostè, etc. Usted is the remaining form from a number of variants used in Renaissance Spanish, such as Usté, Uced, Vuesa Merced, Vuesarced, Vusted, Su Merced, Vuesasted or Voaced. The possibility of a link with the Arabic word ustādh ('mister'/'professor'/'doctor') seems very remote.
paella: It is commonly believed in certain Arabic countries that the rice dish paella comes from the Arabic baqiya (meaning leftovers). The Spanish pronunciation of paella is similar to the Arabic "baqiya", particularly where the latter is pronounced with a silent qaaf as in a number of eastern Arabic dialects. Nevertheless, the word paella is a Catalan word of Latin origin and refers to the pan in which it is cooked, with Spanish, Italian, French and Portuguese cognates Padilla, Padella, Poêle and Panela.

Other influences

Hypothesis of the Verb–subject–object (VSO) sentence structure
As in most Romance languages, word order in Spanish is primarily governed by topicalization and focalization. This means that in practice the main syntactic constituents of a Spanish sentence can be in any order. In addition, certain types of sentence tend to favour specific orders. However, as all Romance languages, modern Spanish is classified in linguistic typology as an SVO language, because this order of constituents is considered the most unmarked one.

In 1981, Spanish philologist Rafael Lapesa hypothesized that VSO sentence orders being more frequent in Spanish and Portuguese than other Romance languages was likely due to a Semitic (presumably Arabic) input in the language. Lapesa at the time considered that the topic had not been sufficiently investigated and required a more rigorous comparative study of Spanish with other Romance and Semitic languages.

A 2008 study concludes that, although the earliest documentation written in Spanish (13th century) can be analysed as having a VSO order, this does not affect documents written after that time. It has also been hypothesized that VSO was still the unmarked order for literary works as late as the 17th century.

A 2012 comparative study of Spanish, Italian and French showed French to be the most strictly Subject–verb–object (SVO) language of the three followed by Italian. In terms of constituent order, Spanish is the least restricted among the three languages, French is the most restricted, and Italian is intermediate. In the case of French, this is the result of a historical process, as old French was less restricted in word order. As for the VSO order, it is absent from both French and Italian, but not from Spanish.

The suffix í
Arabic has a very common type of adjective, known as the nisba or relationship adjective, which is formed by adding the suffix -ī (masc.) or ية -iyya (fem.) to a noun. This has given Spanish the suffix -í (both masc. and fem.), creating adjectives from nouns which indicate relationship or belonging, mostly for items related to medieval history, or demonyms in Arab. Examples are marbellí, ceutí, maghrebí, zaragocí, andalusí or alfonsí.

Expressions
A number of expressions such as "¡Ole!" (sometimes spelled "olé" ), possibly from wa'llah, or ojalá, from law sha'a Allah, have been borrowed directly from Arabic. Furthermore, many expressions in Spanish might have been calqued from their Arabic equivalent. Examples would be si Dios quiere, que Dios guarde or bendito sea Dios.

Idafa
The Idafa was a feature of the Mozarabic dialects which had a major formative on modern Spanish. Although this morphological structure is no longer in use, it is still widely present in toponyms throughout Spain including names of recent origin such as the suburban colonies of Ciudalcampo and Guadalmar in Madrid and Malaga respectively.

Toponyms (place names) in Spain of Arabic origin

There are thousands of place names derived from Arabic in the Iberian peninsula including provinces and regions, cities, towns, villages and even neighborhoods and streets. They also include geographical features such as mountains, mountain ranges, valleys and rivers. Toponyms derived from Arabic are common in Spain except for those regions which never came under Muslim rule or where it was particularly short-lived. These regions include Galicia and the Northern coast (Asturias, Cantabria and the Basque country) as well as much of Catalonia, Navarre and northern Aragon. Regions where place names of Arabic origin are particularly common are Balearics, Eastern Coast (Valencia and Murcia) and Andalusia. 
Those toponyms which maintained their pre-Islamic name during the Muslim period were generally Arabized, and the mark of either the old Arabic pronunciation or the popular pronunciation from which it derived is sometimes noticeable in their modern names: e.g. Latin Hispalis = Arabic Ishbiliya = modern Sevilla.

Major towns, cities and regions
Albarracín City of Aragón. Derived from Al Banū Razin, name of the Berber family of the town.
Alcalá de Henares City in the Community of Madrid. Derived from al-qal'a, meaning citadel or fortress. Henares may also come from the Arabic name for river: nahar.
Alcántara (several places) from Arabic al qantara (القنطرة), meaning "the bridge".
Alcarria Large plateau region east of Madrid covering much of Guadalajara as well as part of eastern Madrid and northern Cuenca. From Arabic al-qaryat.
Axarquía Eastern region of Málaga province, From Arabic Ash-sharquía(): The eastern/oriental (region).
Andalucía Most populated and 2nd largest autonomous community in Spain.
Albacete city and province of Castilla-La Mancha. Derived from Arabic Al-Basit  (the plain).
Algarve Region of southern Portugal. From Arabic Al-Gharb, the west.
Algeciras City and port in Cadiz province. Derived from Al Jazeera Al Khadra  meaning the green island.
Almería City and province of Andalucía. From Al-Meraya, the watchtower.
Alpujarras (originally Alpuxarras) Region extending South of Granada into Almería. From Arabic al-basharāt: The grasslands.
Calatayud City of Aragón. Derived from Qal'at Ayyūb (Arabic ) meaning "(Ayyūb's) Job's  Fortress".
Gibraltar British overseas territory and name given to surrounding area in Southern Spain (Campo de Gibraltar). From Arabic ( pronounced Jebel Tariq), "Mountain of Tariq", or Gibr al-Tariq meaning "Rock of Tariq".
Granada City in Andalusia. Originally Garnata in Andalusi Arabic. From Gar-a-nat, Hill of pilgrims.
Guadalajara City and province of Castilla la Mancha. From Wādī al-Ḥijārah (Arabic ), River or canyon of Stones.
Jaén City and province of Andalusia From Arabic Jayyan, crossroads of caravans.
Medina-Sidonia: Town and municipality in Cadiz province, from Madina, city.
Tarifa town in Cadiz province, Andalusia. Originally Jazeera Tarif: the island of Tarif. Derived from the first name of the Berber conqueror Tarif ibn Malik.
La Sagra, an arid region between Toledo and Madrid. Name derived from Arabic  ṣaḥrāʾ "desert".
Úbeda, a town in Jaén province, Andalusia. From the Arabic Ubadat el Arab.
Sanlúcar de Barrameda, a city in the northwest of Cádiz province, Andalusia. "Sanlúcar" may have derived from the Arabic shaluqa, the Arabic name for the Levant wind called sirocco or jaloque; "Barrameda" was derived from bar-am-ma'ida, an Arabic phrase for "water well of the plateau".

Geographical features
 River Almanzora. Derived from Arabic: Al-Mansura.
 River Guadiana. Meaning "River Anae" (from the original Latin name Fluminus Anae, "River of Ducks").
 River Guadalquivir. Derived from Arabic: Al-Wādĩ Al-Kabir , "the big river".
 Javalambre. Mountain in southern Aragon, Jabal 'Amr, meaning "Mountain of 'Amr".
 Mulhacén. Highest mountain in peninsular Spain. Named after 15th century Sultan of Granada Ali Muley Hacén Abu al-Hasan.
 Pico Almanzor. Mountain in the Gredos Mountains of Central Spain. Named after "Almanzor" Al-Mansur Ibn Abi Aamir, de facto ruler of Al Andalus in late 10th - early 11th centuries.
 Cape Trafalgar. From Andalusi Arabic Taraf-al-gharb ('Western Cape' or 'Cape of the West').

Given names and surnames

Given names
Almudena (from the Virgin of Almudena, patroness of Madrid, Spain) and Fátima (derived from Our Lady of Fátima) are common Spanish names rooted in the country's Roman Catholic tradition, but share Arabic etymologies originating in place names of religious significance. Guadalupe, a name present throughout the Spanish-speaking world, particularly in Mexico, also shares this feature.

A few given names of Arab origin have become present in the Spanish-speaking world. In Spain, this coincided with a more flexible attitude to non-Catholic names, which were highly discouraged during the first decades of the Francoist dictatorship. Arabic names that have been present in Spain for many decades include Omar and Soraya. Zaida is also present in Spain, perhaps after Zaida of Seville, the mistress or wife of King Alfonso VI of Castile in the 11th century. A number of streets throughout Spain bear the name of this Muslim princess. Zahira and Zaira are also popular girls' names of Muslim origin. It is in the Spanish enclaves of Ceuta and Melilla in the African continent where Arabic given names are common.

Surnames
Surnames of indirect Arabic origin, such as Medina, Almunia, Guadarrama or Alcaide, are common and often refer to toponyms or professions, but they are not of Arabic origin, properly speaking. Few Arabic surnames explicitly denote Arabic origin since in the 15th and the 16th centuries, religious minorities were required to change their surnames upon baptism to escape persecution. The Muslim minority was specifically compelled to convert and adopt Christian surnames by a series of royal decrees in the 16th century, when Morisco leader Muhammad Ibn Ummaya, for example, was born to the Christian name Fernando de Córdoba y Valor.

Exceptions to the general rule are rare, but one is the surname "Benjumea" or "Benjumeda", which denotes ancestry from the Ummayad nobility. Currently, fewer than 6,000 Spaniards have this surname. Another, even less common, surname denoting Muslim lineage is "Muley", which is still present in the Spanish South East, and was maintained for its noble lineage.

See also
 Influences on the Spanish language
 Influence of Arabic on other languages
 List of Arabic loanwords in English
 List of French words of Arabic origin
 Spanish terms derived from Arabic (wiktionary)

References

Selected reference works and other academic literature

These works have not necessarily been consulted in the preparation of this article.

Abu-Haidar, J. A. 1985. Review of Felipe Maíllo Salgado, Los arabismos del castellano en la baja edad media (consideraciones históricas y filológicas). Bulletin of the School of Oriental and African Studies, 48(2): 353-354. University of London. 
Cabo Pan, José Luis. El legado del arabe. Mosaico 8:7-10. Revista para la Promoción y Apoyo a la Enseñanza del Español. Ministerio de Educación y Ciencia del Reino de España, Consejería de Educación y Ciencia en Bélgica, Países Bajos y Luxemburgo. [Article with convenient, short word lists, grouped by theme. In PDF. Refer to Mosaico'''s portal page.] ]
Corominas, Joan. 1980-1991. Diccionario crítico etimológico castellano e hispánico. Madrid: Gredos. The first edition, with the title Diccionario crítico etimológico de la lengua castellana (1954–1957) includes an appendix that groups words according to language of origin.
Corriente, Federico. 2003. Diccionario de arabismos y voces afines en iberorromance. (2nd expanded ed.; 1st ed. 1999) Madrid: Gredos. 607 p.
Real Academia Española (Royal Spanish Academy). Diccionario de la lengua española (DRAE), online.
Maíllo Salgado, Felipe. 1991/1998. Los arabismos del castellano en la Baja Edad Media : consideraciones históricas y filológicas. Salamanca: Universidad de Salamanca. 554 p. [2nd ed., corrected and enlarged; 1st ed. 1983]
Ibid. 1996. Vocabulario de historia árabe e islámica. Madrid: Akal. 330 p.
 Marcos Marín, Francisco 1998 Romance andalusí y mozárabe: dos términos no sinónimos. Estudios de Lingüística y Filología Españolas. Homenaje a Germán Colón. Madrid: Gredos, 335-341.
 Ibid. 1998 Toledo: su nombre árabe y sus consecuencias lingüísticas hispánicas. Revista del Instituto Egipcio de Estudios Islámicos en Madrid, XXX, 1998, 93-108.
Sola-Solé, Josep María. 1983. Sobre árabes, judíos y marranos y su impacto en la lengua y literatura españolas. Barcelona: Puvill. 279 p.
Spaulding, Robert K. 1942/1971. [https://books.google.com/books?id=Vl8lFy4qQX4C&q=%22how+spanish+grew%22+spaulding How Spanish Grew. Berkeley: University of California Press. Chapter 5: "Arabic Spain", pp. 53–62.
Toro Lillo, Elena. La invasión árabe. Los árabes y el elemento árabe en español''. In the Cervantes Virtual Library. Includes a brief list of historical sound changes. Useful bibliography.

Selected resource pages of universities and research institutes
 Instituto de Estudios Islámicos y del Oriente Próximo. Search results consisting of Institute publications whose entries contain the word "arabismos"
 Universidad de Granada. Holdings under the subject "arabismos"

External links
 La invasión árabe. Los árabes y el elemento árabe en español, by Elena Toro Lillo; Biblioteca Virtual Miguel de Cervantes
Arabic Influences in Various Languages
 Size and nature of the Spanish vocabulary

Spanish etymology
Lists of Spanish words of foreign origin
Spanish language
Arabic words and phrases
L
Islam in Spain
Language contact